The Vietnam Davis Cup team represents Vietnam in Davis Cup tennis competition and are governed by the Vietnam Tennis Federation. The President of VTF is Mr Nguyễn Danh Thái while the General Secretary is Mr Nguyen Quoc Ky. Commercial and International Affairs is handled by Mr Long Le Hoang.

Vietnam currently compete in the Asia/Oceania Zone of Group III. As South Vietnam they reached the final of Eastern Zone A in 1964, and of Eastern Zone B in  1965, 1969 and of Eastern Zone Preliminary Rounds in 1973.

History
Vietnam competed in its first Davis Cup in 1964 as South Vietnam until 1974 before returning as Vietnam in 2003. After 10 years of competition in Asia/Oceania Groups 3 and 4, the Vietnamese team made it to Group 2 for the very first time in 2014.

Current team (2022) 

 Lý Hoàng Nam
 Nguyễn Văn Phương
 Trịnh Linh Giang
 Phạm Minh Tuấn
 Lê Quốc Khánh

Results

 Vietnam stayed at Asia/Oceania Group III for the following year after a format change to the competition.

See also
Davis Cup

References

External links

Davis Cup teams
Davis Cup
Davis Cup